The Alco S-6 (specification DL 430) was a diesel-electric locomotive of the switcher type constructed by ALCO of Schenectady, New York; a total of 126 locomotives were built between May 1955 and December 1960. The S-6 was an improved version of the earlier S-5.

Design 
The locomotive rode on two-axle AAR trucks, giving a B-B wheel arrangement. ALCO produced a cow-calf variant for the Oliver Iron Mining Company designated SB-8/SSB-9, two sets were produced of this version.

Original owners

In popular culture 
 In Back to the Future Part III, two double headed S-6 locomotives destroyed the DeLorean time machine, when it returned to 1985.

See also 
 List of ALCO diesel locomotives
 List of MLW diesel locomotives

References

External links

 Sarberenyi, Robert. Alco S5, S6, and SSB9 Original Owners.

B-B locomotives
S6
Diesel-electric locomotives of the United States
Railway locomotives introduced in 1955
Locomotives with cabless variants
Standard gauge locomotives of the United States
Standard gauge locomotives of Mexico
Diesel-electric locomotives of Mexico